Tripura Bani is the Bengali language mouthpiece of the Tripura State Committee of the All India Forward Bloc. Tripura Bani is published weekly. It is published from Agartala. As of 1983 Tripura Bani had a circulation of 1,900 copies. As of 2007 it claimed a weekly circulation of 5,895 copies.

Brajagopal Roy served as the editor of Tripura Bani until his death in July 2022.

References

Bengali-language newspapers published in India
Mass media in Tripura
All India Forward Bloc
Publications with year of establishment missing
Newspapers published in Tripura